The men's team recurve archery competition at the 2014 Asian Games in Incheon was held from 23 to 28 September 2014 at Gyeyang Asiad Archery Field.

A total of 18 teams participated in the qualification round, but only 16 progressed to the knockout round.

Schedule
All times are Korea Standard Time (UTC+09:00)

Results
Legend
DNS — Did not start

Ranking round

Knockout round

1/8 eliminations

Quarterfinals

Semifinals

Bronze medal match

Gold medal match

References

External links
Official website

Men's recurve team